Amphiarius rugispinis, the softhead sea catfish, is a species of sea catfish which is found along the northern coast of South America. It is found chiefly in turbid waters of estuaries and around river mouths; it originates from brackish and marine waters of Trinidad and Tobago, Guyana, Suriname, French Guiana, and Brazil.  This species grows to about  TL.   Reproduction in A. rugispinis appears to be between September to November. The diameter of the eggs is 14–15 millimetres (9⁄16 in), numbering about 30–35 per female.

References
 

Ariidae
Fish of South America
Fish of Trinidad and Tobago
Fish described in 1840